Hexameroceras is a genus of nautiloid cephalopods belonging to the order Oncocerida that lived during the middle and late Silurian. Its fossils have been found in North America in Indiana, New York, Ohio, and Wisconsin, and in Europe in the Czech Republic.

Hexameroceras is similar to Tetrameroceras but has 3 pairs of dorsolateral sinuses (lateral embayments in the aperture) and narrow mid-dorsal projection or salient. The shell, as for the family, is breviconic, i.e. short, curved toward the apex, straight toward the aperture. The siphuncle is ventral, nummuloidal and contains inwardly radial actinosiphonate deposits.

References

 Walter C. Sweet, 1964. Nautiloidea - Oncicerida,  Treatise on Invertebrate Paleontoloty, Part K. Geological Society of America.
 Hexameroceras in Fossilworks Gateway.

Prehistoric nautiloid genera
Silurian animals
Fossil taxa described in 1884
Oncocerida